A municipality (plural ) is the smallest administrative subdivision of Estonia. Each municipality is a unit of self-government with its representative and executive bodies. The municipalities in Estonia cover the entire territory of the country.

Municipalities in Estonia are of two types: 
Urban municipalities or towns (singular )
Rural municipalities or parishes (singular ).

There is no other status distinction between them.

Municipalities may contain one or several settlements. All but 5 urban municipalities (Haapsalu, Narva-Jõesuu, Paide, Pärnu and Tartu) plus 1 rural municipality (Ruhnu) contain only one settlement. As of 2017, there are no longer any "borough-parishes", i.e. rural municipalities with only one borough-type settlement. Ruhnu Parish contains only one village and is therefore a "village-parish".

Some municipalities are divided into districts. The 8 urban districts (singular ) of Tallinn have limited self-government, while other urban districts are formed for administrative purposes. Some rural districts have limited self-government, while other types of rural districts do not.

Municipalities range in population from Tallinn with 427,500 inhabitants to Ruhnu with 68. Previously, as over two-thirds of the municipalities had a population of under 3,000, many of them found it advantageous to co-operate in providing services and carrying out administrative functions.

After the administrative reform was completed in October 2017, there are total of 79 municipalities, 15 of which are urban and 64 rural. 51 of the present municipalities were the result of mergers, 28 remain unchanged. After the reform small municipalities with under 5,000 inhabitants have been reduced from a number of 169 to 15. The number of councillors was reduced from 2,026 to 1,019. The municipalities are:

List

Gallery of Maps

Structure of local authorities 
In each municipality there is a local government as well as a council.

The council is a representative body elected by the residents of a municipality for a term of three years. The members of the council elect a chairman, who organises the council's work and represents the municipality.

The government is an executive body formed by the council. It is headed by a mayor ( in towns,  in parishes), who is appointed for a four-year term. The mayor cannot be the chairman of the council. Other members of the government are chosen by the mayor with the approval of the council.

Former municipalities 
The list of municipalities that have merged or lost existence between 1995 and 2017.

1996
Pärnu-Jaagupi borough was merged into Halinga Parish
1998
Abja-Paluoja town was merged into Abja Parish
1999
Otepää town and Pühajärve Parish formed Otepää Parish
Lihula town was merged into Lihula Parish
Võsu borough was merged into Vihula Parish
Karksi-Nuia town was merged into Karksi Parish
Kaarma Parish and Kuressaare Parish formed Kaarma Parish
Antsla town was merged into Antsla Parish
2002
Kehra town was merged into Anija Parish
Rapla town was merged into Rapla Parish
Räpina town was merged into Räpina Parish
Kohila borough was merged into Kohila Parish
Märjamaa borough, Märjamaa Parish and Loodna Parish formed Märjamaa Parish
2005
Tapa town, Saksi Parish and Lehtse Parish formed Tapa Parish
Jõhvi town was merged into Jõhvi Parish
Kuusalu Parish and Loksa Parish formed Kuusalu Parish
Kilingi-Nõmme town, Saarde Parish and Tali Parish formed Saarde Parish
Suure-Jaani town, Olustvere Parish, Suure-Jaani Parish and Vastemõisa Parish formed Suure-Jaani Parish
Türi town, Türi Parish, Oisu Parish and Kabala Parish formed Türi Parish
Tamsalu town was merged into Tamsalu Parish
2009
Kaisma Parish and Vändra Parish formed Vändra Parish
2013
Pärsti Parish, Paistu Parish, Viiratsi Parish and Saarepeedi Parish formed Viljandi Parish
Põlva town was merged into Põlva Parish
Kose Parish and Kõue Parish formed Kose Parish
Lavassaare borough was merged into Audru Parish
Kärdla town and Kõrgessaare Parish formed Hiiu Parish
Oru Parish, Risti Parish and Taebla Parish formed Lääne-Nigula Parish
Püssi town, Maidla Parish and Lüganuse Parish formed Lüganuse Parish
2014
Kaarma Parish, Kärla Parish and Lümanda Parish formed Lääne-Saare Parish
2017
Aegviidu borough was merged into Anija Parish
Keila Parish, Padise Parish, Vasalemma Parish and Paldiski town formed Lääne-Harju Parish
Saue town, Saue Parish, Kernu Parish and Nissi Parish formed Saue Parish
Hiiu Parish, Emmaste Parish, Käina Parish and Pühalepa Parish formed Hiiumaa Parish
Kiviõli town, Lüganuse Parish and Sonda Parish formed Lüganuse Parish
Alajõe Parish, Iisaku Parish, Illuka Parish, Mäetaguse Parish and Tudulinna Parish formed Alutaguse Parish
Toila Parish, Kohtla Parish and Kohtla-Nõmme borough formed Toila Parish
Narva-Jõesuu town and Vaivara Parish formed Narva-Jõesuu (urban municipality)
Albu Parish, Ambla Parish, Imavere Parish, Järva-Jaani, Kareda Parish, Koeru Parish and Koigi Parish formed Järva Parish
Türi Parish, Väätsa Parish and Käru Parish formed Türi Parish
Paide town, Paide Parish and Roosna-Alliku Parish formed Paide (urban municipality)
Jõgeva town, Jõgeva Parish, Palamuse Parish, most of Torma Parish and some parts of Puurmani Parish formed Jõgeva Parish
Põltsamaa town, Põltsamaa Parish, Pajusi Parish and most of Puurmani Parish formed Põltsamaa Parish
Mustvee town, Kasepää Parish, Saare Parish, Lohusuu Parish, Avinurme Parish and some parts of Torma Parish formed Mustvee Parish
Haapsalu town and Ridala Parish formed Haapsalu (urban municipality)
Lääne-Nigula Parish, Martna Parish, Kullamaa Parish, Nõva Parish and Noarootsi Parish formed Lääne-Nigula Parish
Viru-Nigula Parish, Aseri Parish and Kunda town formed Viru-Nigula Parish
Haljala Parish and Vihula Parish formed Haljala Parish
Rakvere Parish and Sõmeru Parish formed Rakvere Parish
Tapa Parish and Tamsalu Parish formed Tapa Parish
Väike-Maarja Parish and Rakke Parish formed Väike-Maarja Parish
Vinni Parish, Laekvere Parish and Rägavere Parish formed Vinni Parish
Pärnu town, Audru Parish, Tõstamaa Parish and Paikuse Parish formed Pärnu (urban municipality)
Lihula Parish, Hanila Parish, Koonga Parish and Varbla Parish formed Lääneranna Parish
Halinga Parish, Vändra Parish, Vändra borough and Tootsi borough formed Põhja-Pärnumaa Parish
Tori Parish, Are Parish, Sauga Parish and Sindi town formed Tori Parish
Häädemeeste Parish and Tahkuranna Parish formed Häädemeeste Parish
Saarde Parish and Surju Parish formed Saarde Parish
Põlva Parish, Laheda Parish, Ahja Parish, Mooste Parish and Vastse-Kuuste Parish formed Põlva Parish
Kanepi Parish, Valgjärve Parish and Kõlleste Parish formed Kanepi Parish
Räpina Parish, Veriora Parish and Meeksi Parish formed Räpina Parishˇ
Rapla Parish, Juuru Parish, Kaiu Parish and most of Raikküla Parish formed Rapla Parish
Märjamaa Parish, Vigala Parish and some parts of Raikküla Parish formed Märjamaa Parish
Kehtna Parish and Järvakandi borough formed Kehtna Parish
Kuressaare town, Lääne-Saare Parish, Salme Parish, Torgu Parish, Kihelkonna Parish, Mustjala Parish, Leisi Parish, Pihtla Parish, Valjala Parish, Orissaare Parish, Pöide Parish and Laimjala Parish formed Saaremaa Parish
Tartu town and Tähtvere Parish formed Tartu (urban municipality)
Elva town, Konguta Parish, Rannu Parish, Rõngu Parish, Puhja Parish and parts of Puka Parish and Palupera Parish formed Elva Parish
Tartu Parish, Laeva Parish, Piirissaare Parish and Tabivere Parish formed Tartu Parish
Kallaste town, Peipsiääre Parish, Alatskivi Parish, Vara Parish and Pala Parish formed Peipsiääre Parish
Kambja Parish and Ülenurme Parish formed Kambja Parish
Haaslava Parish, Mäksa Parish and Võnnu Parish formed Kastre Parish
Valga town, Karula Parish, Taheva Parish, Tõlliste Parish and Õru Parish formed Valga Parish
Otepää Parish, Sangaste Parish and parts of Puka Parish and Palupera Parish formed Otepää Parish
Tõrva town, Helme Parish, Hummuli Parish and Põdrala Parish formed Tõrva Parish
Viljandi Parish, Tarvastu Parish and Kolga-Jaani Parish formed Viljandi Parish
Suure-Jaani Parish, Kõpu Parish, Kõo Parish and Võhma town formed Põhja-Sakala Parish
Abja Parish, Karksi Parish, Halliste Parish and Mõisaküla town formed Mulgi Parish
Võru Parish, Lasva Parish, Sõmerpalu Parish, Vastseliina Parish and Orava Parish formed Võru Parish
Antsla Parish and Urvaste Parish formed Antsla Parish
Rõuge Parish, Haanja Parish, Varstu Parish, Mõniste Parish and most of Misso Parish formed Rõuge Parish
Meremäe Parish, Värska Parish, Mikitamäe Parish and some parts of Misso Parish formed Setomaa Parish

Former municipalities (before 1990) 

Vaoküla Parish (existed 1939–1950)

See also 
 Counties of Estonia
 Populated places in Estonia

References

External links
 Local Government Reform by the Estonian Institute.
 Local Government Reform by the Institute of Baltic Studies.
 Administrative Division of Estonia at the Institute of the Estonian Language website.

 
Subdivisions of Estonia
Estonia, Municipalities
Estonia 2
Municipalities, Estonia
Municipalities
Estonia